Diana Ospina may refer to:

Diana Ospina (footballer) (born 1989), Colombian international footballer
Diana Ospina (tennis) (born 1979), American professional tennis player